USS LST-1 was an  of the United States Navy built during World War II. She was the lead ship in her class of 390 and like many of her class, she was not named and is properly referred to by her hull designation.

Construction
LST-1 was laid down on 20 July 1942, at Pittsburgh, Pennsylvania by the Dravo Corporation; launched on 7 September 1942; sponsored by Mrs. Laurence T. Haugen; and commissioned on 14 December 1942.

Service history
During World War II, LST-1 was assigned to the European Theater and participated in the following operations: Allied invasion of Sicily in July 1943; Salerno Landings in September 1943; Anzio-Nettuno advanced landings on the west coast of Italy from January to March 1944; and the Invasion of Normandy in June 1944.

LST-1 was decommissioned on 21 May 1946, and was struck from the Naval Vessel Register on 19 June 1946. On 5 December 1947, she was sold to the Ships Power and Equipment Company of Barber, New Jersey, for scrapping.

Awards
LST-1 earned four battle star for World War II service.

References

Bibliography

External links

 

 

World War II amphibious warfare vessels of the United States
Ships built in Pittsburgh
1942 ships
LST-1-class tank landing ships of the United States Navy
Ships built by Dravo Corporation